Kishore ([ˈraːm kɪʃoːr]) is an Indian name that may refer to:

Given or middle name
 Kishore (actor, born 1974) (born 1974), Indian film actor
 Kishore Bhanushali, Indian actor 
 Kishore Bhatt (born 1951), Indian voice actor 
 Kishore Biyani, Indian businessman 
 Kishore Chandra Deo (born 1947), Indian politician 
 Kishore Chauhan (born 1949), Indian criminal 
 Kishore DS, Indian film actor
 Kishore Dang (born 1958), Indian film and TV show director
 Kishore Kumar (1929–1987), film playback singer, actor, lyricist, composer, producer, director, and screenwriter
 Kishore Kunal, Indian Sanskrit scholar 
 Kishore Mahbubani (born 1948), Singaporean diplomat
 Kishore Namit Kapoor (born 1949), Indian actor, author and film-acting trainer 
 Kishore Pawar (c.1926–2013), Indian trade union leader and politician
 Kishore Sahu (1915–1980), Indian actor, film director, screenwriter and producer
 Kishore Te (1978–2015), Indian film editor
 Kishore Upadhyaya, Indian politician
 Ashish Kishore Lele (born 1967), Indian chemical engineer
 Bira Kishore Ray, Chief Justice of Orissa High Court in India
 Chandra Kishore Shrestha, Indian dramatist and social worker
 Deepali Kishore  (born 1989), Indian singer
 Dhirendra Kishore Chakravarti (1902–after 1982), geologist and paleontologist
 Ganga Kishore Bhattacharya (died 1831), Indian journalist, teacher and reformer
 Kant Kishore Bhargava, Indian diplomat 
 Ladu Kishore Swain, Indian politician.
 Mohan Kishore Namadas, Indian revolutionary and independence fighter in the 1930s
 Naba Kishore Ray (born 1940), Indian theoretical and computational chemist
 Nand Kishore Acharya (born 1945), Indian playwright, poet, and critic 
 Nand Kishore Chaudhary (born 1953), Indian social entrepreneur
 Nand Kishore Garg (born 1949), Indian social worker 
 Nandikishore Patel (born 1982), Indian-born Ugandan cricketer
 Nand Kishore Yadav, Indian cabinet minister 
 Nand Kishore Yadav (SP), Indian politician 
 Nanda Kishore, Indian film director and screenwriter
 Nanda Kishore Bal (1875–1928), Indian poet 
 Pran Kishore Kaul, Kashmiri stage personality
 Raj Kishore Kesri (died 2011), Indian politician
 Ram Kishore Shukla (1923–2003), Indian politician 
 Ravindra Kishore Sinha (born 1951), Indian journalist, politician and social entrepreneur

Surname
 Akhila Kishore, Indian film actress 
 Andrew Kishore, Bangladeshi singer
 Gadari Kishore, Indian politician 
 Giriraj Kishore (1920–2014), Indian Hindu nationalist 
 Joseph Kishore (born 1980), American activist and writer 
 Jugal Kishore (disambiguation), several people
 Kaushal Kishore (disambiguation), several people
 Munshi Nawal Kishore (1836—1895), Indian book publisher 
 Nand Kishore (cricketer, born 1970), Indian cricketer
 Nanda Kishore, Indian film director and screenwriter 
 Ravisrinivasan Sai Kishore (born 1996), Indian cricketer 
 S. Kishore (born 1962), Sri Lankan Tamil politician 
 Shalinee Kishore (born 1974), American electrical engineer
 Shelly Kishore, Indian film and television actress 
 Shriya Kishore (born 1986), Indian beauty queen 
 Sneha Kishore (born 1993), Indian cricketer 
 Sravanthi Ravi Kishore, Indian film producer 
 Tanvi Kishore, Indian Marathi film actress
 Vennela Kishore, Indian Tollywood actor

See also 
 Kishore (disambiguation)
 Kishor

Indian masculine given names